International Socialist Congress may refer to:

International Socialist Congress, Paris 1900
International Socialist Congress, Amsterdam 1904
International Socialist Congress, Stuttgart 1907

See also
 International Workers Congresses of Paris, 1889